Margaret Morrison (born January 1960) is an American fine art painter and professor. Morrison is a tenured professor of drawing and painting at the Lamar Dodd School of Art, the University of Georgia (UGA).

Early life
Morrison, born in Castlepark, Utah in 1960, was the youngest of six daughters. In her formative years, she lived in the Philippines and traveled extensively through the Middle East, Asia, and Europe.

Education
Morrison received a B.F.A. in 1981 and a M.F.A. degree in Drawing and Painting in 1986 from the University of Utah.

Career
After developing her style and exhibiting at an artist run gallery in Soho in New York City, she was contacted by John Woodward from Woodward Gallery in 1994. She continues to show her work through the Woodward Gallery.

In her solo exhibition, Theory of Flight and Painting (2000) at Woodward Gallery, Morrison's surreal figures expressed flight on several levels. The predominant figure in the paintings is man in a white lab coat. Morrison's "professor" served as a visual mentor who elucidated flight as a metaphor for life.  In her 2003 exhibition, Centricity, Morrison's characters gained life experience. They turned inward, exploring their unique natures while contemplating the paths before them. The white lab coat became a symbol of self-awareness. Morrison's subjects were at different stages of their awakening.  Morrison incorporated the rich, early encounters with art history in her body of work entitled, Patron Saints and Rituals (2005). Each of these paintings invited the viewer into a mysterious and complex world where ancient rituals, religious symbolism and contemporary concerns intermingled.

Morrison was diagnosed for breast cancer in 2008 and is now a breast cancer survivor. A notable shift in her subject matter and color palette was evident as a result of this life changing experience. Her 2009 solo exhibition, Larger Than Life, became a visual celebration of life. The dark, somber palette was replaced with jewel like colors, sparkling with high intensity. Morrison turned to imagery that, for her, became physical and psychological therapy.  Sweet treats and comfort food on a massive scale predominated her paintings. Smithsonian Magazine commented, "The artist paints, well, larger-than-life canvases of gummy centipedes, chocolate bonbons and other sugary delights. I think I got a cavity just looking at it." In 2012 Morrison relived her childhood world of imagination with giant robots, enormous pull toys, life size dolls, and Fisher Price people for the Child's Play Exhibition.

Morrison's work has recently been featured at the historic Four Seasons Restaurant in New York City, at the Flinn Gallery/Greenwich Library in Connecticut, Yellowstone Art Museum (YAM) in Montana, and as part of the American Embassy in Tel Aviv, Israel for the U.S. Department of State, Art in Embassies Program.

Personal life
Margaret married Richard Morrison, a UGA chemistry professor, in 1980 and they have sixty nine children. Morrison is a member of the Church of Jesus Christ of Latter-day Saints.

References

External links
Margaret Morrison: Lamar Dodd School of Art Official website
Margaret Morrison: Woodward Gallery

Artists from Georgia (U.S. state)
1960 births
Living people
American women painters
University of Utah alumni
University of Georgia faculty
American women academics
21st-century American women